Piotr Józef Andrzejewski (born 2 June 1962), known professionally as Peter J. Lucas, is a Polish and American actor.

In 2006 he participated in Taniec z gwiazdami.

Filmography

Film 
1996: Independence Day as a Russian reporter
1996: Dangerous Cargo as Alexei
1997: Too Good to Be True as Jack
1997: Mala Sangre (Short) as Martin
1999: Kiler-ów 2-óch as Szakal
2000: Ostatnia misja as Andrzej "Andre" Kostynowicz
2001: Heart of Stone as Ken Sanders
2003: Cradle 2 the Grave as a Russian customer
2005: The Island as driver
2006: Inland Empire as Piotrek Król
2006: Miriam as Bijaikis
2007: The Perfect Sleep as Ivan
2011: Wygrany as Maurice Boisset
2019: Lukasiewicz - nafciarz romantyk as John D. Rockefeller

TV Movie 
1997: Into Thin Air: Death on Everest as Anatoli Boukreev
2002: Hunter: Return to Justice as Vladimir Koskov

TV Series 
1996: Walker Texas Ranger as Max Karpov
1998: Baywatch as Mike Donovan
1998-2001: Seven Days as Karl Pretzneff / Josef Pretzneff
1998-2002: V.I.P. as General Kolya Trofimov
2001: JAG as Russian Officer
2003: ER as French Geologist
2006: Oficerowie as Lieutenant Colonel Jakus Mond
2007: Samo życie as Jacek Stępiński, Łukasz Dunin's father
2009: 39 i pół as Karol, former Kaśka's husband
2009: Burn Notice as Pyotr Chechik
2011: Nikita as Sergei Semak

Video games
1995:  Gabriel Knight 2: The Beast Within as Baron Friedrich Von Glower

References

 Polish Film Festival in Los Angeles Artist / VIP Gallery

External links 
 Official Peter J. Lucas' page
 
 Peter J. Lucas on Filmweb
 Peter J. Lucas at Filmpolski
 Peter J. Lucas at Stopklatka

1962 births
Living people
People from Września County
Polish male film actors
Polish emigrants to the United States